Rockwell Run is a mountain stream in Morgan County, West Virginia.  It is a tributary of the Potomac River.

The Rockwell Formation is named after Rockwell Run, where exposures of the formation were first described by Stose and Swartz in 1912.

See also
List of rivers of West Virginia

References

Rivers of Morgan County, West Virginia
Tributaries of the Potomac River
Rivers of West Virginia